Elegia elephantina, the large Cape rush, is a species of reedlike flowering plant in the family Restionaceae, native to the western Cape Provinces of South Africa. It has gained the Royal Horticultural Society's Award of Garden Merit as an ornamental.

References

elephantina
Endemic flora of South Africa
Flora of the Cape Provinces
Plants described in 2010